}}

 is a passenger railway station  located in the town of Daisen, Tottori Prefecture, Japan. It is operated by the West Japan Railway Company (JR West).

Lines

Station layout
The station consists of two opposed ground-level side platform connected by a footbridge. The station is unattended.

Platforms

History
Shimoichi Station opened on August 28, 1903. With the privatization of the Japan National Railways (JNR) on April 1, 1987, the station came under the aegis of the West Japan Railway Company.

Passenger statistics
In fiscal 2018, the station was used by an average of 170 passengers daily.

Surrounding area
Oyama Municipal Nakayama Junior High School
Japan National Route 9

See also
List of railway stations in Japan

References

External links 

 Shimoichi Station from JR-Odekake.net 

Railway stations in Tottori Prefecture
Stations of West Japan Railway Company
Sanin Main Line
Railway stations in Japan opened in 1903
Daisen, Tottori